Pezzini is a surname ultimately derived from the Medieval Latin word "pecia," or "petia," meaning "piece," sometimes a piece of cloth, sometimes a token, like a silver coin. As a surname it is thought to have been taken on as a habitational name from any of numerous places so named, such as Pezzana and Piedmont.

Notable people with this name
Cristoforo Pezzini, Italian politician
Lucas Pezzini Leiva, Brazilian footballer

Fictional Characters
Sara Pezzini, or The Witchblade, a DC Comics character

References

Surnames